The Bridgman Award is a prize given every two years by the International Association for the Advancement of High Pressure Science and Technology (AIRAPT) for research in the physics, chemistry, or technology of high pressure science. The award is named in honor of Percy Williams Bridgman, Nobel Prize winner and famous pioneer of the physics of high pressure.

Recipients
 1977 Harry George Drickamer
 1979 Boris Vodar, France
 1981 E. Ulrich Franck (1920–2004), professor for physical chemistry at the University of Karlsruhe
 1983 Albert Francis Birch (1903–1992), geophysicist and mineralogist, professor at Harvard University
 1985 Nestor Joseph Trappeniers (1922–2004), professor in Amsterdam
 1987 Francis P. Bundy (1910–2008), diamond synthesis under high pressure in 1954 at General Electric
 1989 Ho-kwang Mao, Carnegie Institution, Washington D.C.
 1991 Shigeru Minomura (1923–2000), professor at the Institute for Condensed Matter Research in Tokyo, later in Hokkaido and at Okayama University
 1993 Arthur L. Ruoff, professor at Cornell University
 1995 Bogdan Baranowski (1927–2014), professor of physical chemistry in Warsaw
 1997 William A. Bassett (born 1931), professor of geology at Cornell University
 1999 Vladimir Fortov
 2001 William J. Nellis
 2003 Neil Ashcroft
 2005 Sergei Mikhailovich Stishov, professor and direct of the Institute of High Pressure Physics of the Russian Academy of Sciences
 2007 Takehiko Yagi, professor at the Institute of Condensed Matter Physics, University of Tokyo
 2009 Russell J. Hemley, director of the Geophysical Laboratory, Carnegie Institution, Washington D.C.
 2011 Eji Ito, emeritus professor at Okayama University
 2013 Karl Syassen
 2015 Paul Loubeyre
 2017 Mikhail Eremets
 2019 Gilbert Collins
 2021 Tetsuo Irifune

References

Science and technology awards
Awards established in 1977